Metal Master is the name of two fictional characters appearing in American comic books published by Marvel Comics.

Publication history
The first Metal Master first appeared in The Incredible Hulk #6 (March 1963), and was created by Stan Lee and Steve Ditko. The character subsequently appears in Rampaging Hulk #3 (June 1977), ROM #30 (May 1982), and Maximum Security #2 (December 2000). Metal Master received an entry in the Official Handbook of the Marvel Universe A-Z #7 (2009).

The second Metal Master first appeared in Avengers #676 and was created by Mark Waid, Al Ewing, Jim Zub, and Pepe Larraz.

Fictional character biography

Molyb
Metal Master was an alien who can psionically control the atoms and molecules of metals like the rest of his species on a planet in the Galaxy of Astra. He was banished from his world for trying to take it over. When he came to Earth, the Metal Master attacked Gamma Base and defeated the Hulk when he refused to join him, bombarding him with metal and preventing him from getting up close.  The Hulk returned with a plastic weapon; when the Metal Master's powers could not affect the gun, he was caught off guard and the Hulk easily beat him and forced him to reverse his actions.

The Metal Master returned to Earth again later, seeking large amounts of metals that the Astrans thrive on. There he encountered the Spaceknight Rom, and tried to control Rom's metal armor. Rom resisted him, and the Metal Master was nearly driven mad by the thought of a metal that he could not control.

Later, the Metal Master wound up in an intergalactic prison. During the events of "Maximum Security", Metal Master was one of the many aliens sent to Earth and he fought the Scarlet Witch.

Sometime later, the Conclave of Seven Planets sentenced Metal Master to a deep space torture prison. He made acquaintances with his fellow cellmates Black Bolt, Absorbing Man, Blinky, and Raava. He and his fellow inmates escape after Absorbing Man seemingly sacrifices himself to help Black Bolt kill the torture prison's Jailer.

Molyn
A new Metal Master named Molyn appears in the "No Surrender" arc" as a member of Grandmaster's Lethal Legion where he was nicknamed the "All-New Metal Master." He and the Lethal Legion go up against Challenger's Black Order in a contest where Earth is the battlefield.

Powers and abilities
The Metal Master possesses the ability to manipulate virtually all types of metal. He can alter their shape and density at will, forming complex objects, liquefy, animate, or levitate them, etc. One exception is Plandarium, the metal from which the armor of Galador's Spaceknights is made. He could affect this rare alloy to some degree, but he cannot control it as with other metals. His alien-like intellect allows him to build starships with intermediate hyperdrive functions, but otherwise at Earth's technological level.

In other media
The Molyb version of Metal Master appeared in The Incredible Hulk segment of The Marvel Super Heroes, voiced by Paul Kligman.

References

Characters created by Stan Lee
Characters created by Steve Ditko
Comics characters introduced in 1963
Fictional characters with metal abilities
Fictional characters with slowed ageing
Marvel Comics aliens
Marvel Comics extraterrestrial supervillains
Marvel Comics supervillains